Margaret Dunn ( Houlihan) is an Irish bagpiper, originally from Cullen, County Cork, now living in Scotland.

Life
She started learning the pipes when she was 9 years old and was initially taught by her father Con Houlihan. She later received lessons from Stephen Power and moved to Scotland when she was 17 to study piping at the Royal Scottish Academy of Music and Drama. Dunn was pipe major of Cullen Pipe Band from Cork when the band became world champions in Grade 3B in 2007.

While in Scotland she joined the grade 1 Shotts and Dykehead Caledonia Pipe Band and with them won the World Pipe Band Championships in 2000. In 2003 Dunn graduated from the Royal Scottish Academy of Music and Drama, with an honours degree in Scottish Traditional Music.

In 2003 Dunn became the first ever female to win an A grade light music competition and in 2008 went on to be the first female to ever play on the Former Winners March Strathspey & Reel competition stage at the Argyllshire Gathering in Oban.

She teaches at the National Piping Centre, and has been tutoring Connor Sinclair since 2004.

In 2006, she married Alastair Dunn, a multiple Gold Medal winner and pipe sergeant of the Field Marshal Montgomery Pipe Band.

Solo awards 
Northern Meetings Silver Medal in 2007
1st MacGregor Memorial Piobaireachd (22 and under) Oban 1999
1st B Grade March, Oban 1999
1st Duncan Johnstone Memorial Piobaireachd 2001
1st B Grade Piobaireachd, Inveraray 2003
1st Strachan Memorial MSR, London 2000
1st A Grade Strathspey and Reel, Oban 2003
1st A Grade March Argyleshire Gathering 2007

References

External links
Margaret and Alastair Dunn

Year of birth missing (living people)
Living people
Irish uilleann pipers
Great Highland bagpipe players